The Lichfield Canal Aqueduct is a potentially navigable aqueduct over the M6 Toll Motorway, just to the west of Lichfield and north of Birmingham, England. The aqueduct is unwatered; it was constructed at the same time as the motorway in anticipation of the restoration of the Lichfield Canal.

History 
The Lichfield Canal (originally part of the Wyrley and Essington Canal) is currently being restored. Restoration was threatened by the construction of the M6 Toll motorway around the north of Birmingham, which cut across the canal's route. The cost of construction was shared; Midland Expressway (the proprietors of the motorway) funded the foundations and the Lichfield & Hatherton Canals Restoration Trust fundraised to finance the superstructure. The aqueduct was installed on 15 and 16 August 2003.

In 2014/2015 Lichfield and Hatherton Canals Restoration Trust received a Social Investment Business (SIB) grant of £336,000 which will enable the Trust to buy land on either side of the aqueduct and carry out the necessary work to rebuild the canal to bring the aqueduct into use.

In April 2015, Midland Expressway Limited donated £50,000 to Lichfield and Hatherton Canals Restoration Trust to honour an undertaking they made when the M6 Toll Motorway was built. The donation is a "substantial contribution" towards the cost of reinstating the Crane Brook Culvert which was removed when the motorway was built.

See also

Canals of the United Kingdom
List of canal aqueducts in the United Kingdom

References

External links
Lichfield and Hatherton Canals Restoration Trust

Bridges to nowhere
Lichfield
Bridges in Staffordshire
Aqueducts in England